Dismorphia cubana, the Cuban dismorphia, is a butterfly in the family Pieridae. It is endemic to Cuba.

References

Dismorphiinae
Butterflies of Cuba
Endemic fauna of Cuba
Butterflies described in 1862